John "Sonny" Franzese Sr. (February 6, 1917 – February 24, 2020) was an American mobster who was a longtime member and former underboss of the Colombo crime family.

Franzese's career in organized crime began in the 1930s and spanned over eight decades. He served as underboss of the Colombo family from 1963 until he was sentenced to 50 years in prison for orchestrating a string of bank robberies across the country in 1967. He was paroled in 1978, but was re-jailed at least six times on parole violations throughout the decades that followed. He became Colombo family underboss again in 2005, until he was convicted of extortion in 2011, and sentenced to eight years in prison. His son John Franzese Jr. had testified against him, becoming the first son of a New York mobster to turn state's evidence and testify against his father. At the time of his release on June 23, 2017, at the age of 100, he was the oldest federal inmate in the United States and the only centenarian in federal custody. He died in a New York City hospital on February 24, 2020, at the age of 103.

Rise in the Colombo crime family
Franzese was born in Naples, Italy, to Carmine Franzese and Maria Corvola on February 6, 1917, according to the Federal Bureau of Prisons. His parents had already immigrated to the United States at the time of his birth, and were back in Italy for a visit. After six months, his family returned with Franzese to their home in Greenpoint, Brooklyn, where his father ran a bakery. His mother had given him the nickname "Sonny" at a young age.

In the late 1930s, Franzese worked under Joseph Profaci, boss of the Profaci crime family (later named the Colombo crime family). His first arrest came in 1938, for assault. In 1942, in the midst of World War II, he was drafted to the United States Army, but was discharged later that year classified as "psychoneurotic with pronounced homicidal tendencies". Court papers accused him of committing rape against a waitress in 1947, but he was never arrested in relation to the crime.

Franzese operated out of New York City and New Jersey and was involved in racketeering, fraud, and loansharking. He was also a regular at the Copacabana and met such stars as Frank Sinatra and Sammy Davis Jr. on a frequent basis. He was also a boxing fan of Rocky Graziano. He became a made man in 1950, and served in the crew of Sebastian "Buster" Aloi, father of former Colombo family acting boss Vincenzo Aloi. He is believed to have been elevated to caporegime or captain in the Colombo family in the mid 1950s by Profaci. By 1963, he had been promoted to underboss by boss Joseph Colombo. In the 1950s and 1960s, Franzese listed his official occupation as an owner of a dry-cleaning store in Brooklyn.

In 1967, Franzese gained a financial interest in a new recording company, Buddah Records. Franzese used Buddah to launder illegal mob earnings and to bribe disc jockeys with payola. He also infiltrated and began to make money through the owner of Calla Records, Nate McCalla, until the recording label ceased operations in 1977, and McCalla was murdered execution style in 1980.

Trial and conviction
He was accused of murdering Genovese crime family hitman-turned-informant Ernest Rupolo in 1964 on the orders of Vito Genovese. Rupolo was shot and stabbed several times before his feet were attached to two concrete blocks and his hands tied before being dumped into Jamaica Bay. He was arrested with nine other people on April 13, 1966, and during his trial, the prosecution produced records that claimed that Franzese had killed between 30 and 50 people. Franzese was later acquitted of the murder.

However, on March 3, 1967, Franzese was convicted in Albany, New York of masterminding a series of four bank robberies across the country in 1965, and was finally sentenced to 50 years in prison at United States Penitentiary, Leavenworth, by judge Jacob Mishler in 1970, after several denied appeals. His son, Michael, alleged that when Mishler sentenced his father, Franzese declared, "You watch. I'm gonna do the whole 50". Franzese's nephew, Salvatore Franzese, reportedly headed Franzese's gambling operations while Franzese was in prison. In 1978, Franzese was released on parole but returned to prison in 1982 for a parole violation. In 1984, Franzese was released on parole again. Until 2008, he was never charged with another crime, although he would return to prison on parole violations on at least six occasions.

Workshop on murder
In 2006, Franzese discussed techniques for mob murders with Gaetano "Guy" Fatato, a Colombo associate, not realizing that Fatato was a government informant and taping the conversation. Franzese told Fatato:

Franzese also told Fatato that he put nail polish on his fingertips before a murder to avoid leaving fingerprints at the crime scene. Franzese also suggested wearing a hairnet during the murder so as to avoid leaving any hair strands at the crime scene that could be DNA analyzed.

Finally, Franzese stressed the importance of properly dealing with the corpse. His procedure was to dismember the corpse in a kiddie pool, dry the severed body parts in a microwave oven, and then run the parts through a commercial-grade garbage disposal. Franzese observed:

Indictments and final sentence

After the 2004 incarceration of John "Jackie" DeRoss, Franzese was again promoted to Colombo family underboss in 2005, for the first time since his 1967 imprisonment, by Thomas Gioeli. However, in May 2007, Franzese was again returned to prison for a parole violation. In June 2008, Franzese, still incarcerated, was indicted on charges of participating in murders during the Colombo Wars of the early 1990s, stealing fur coats in New York City in the mid 1990s, and participating in home invasions by police impersonators in Los Angeles in 2006.

On June 4, 2008, Franzese was indicted along with other Colombo mobsters on charges of racketeering, conspiracy, robbery, extortion, narcotics trafficking, and loansharking. On December 24, 2008, Franzese was released from the Metropolitan Detention Center in Brooklyn. According to law enforcement, Franzese remained the official underboss of the Colombo family.

Franzese's son, John Franzese Jr. became a government informant. Franzese Jr. was allegedly also responsible for his father's fourth parole violation, but was accepted back into his confidence after denying the allegations in tears, saying, "I would never do that, no matter what kind of trouble I had." In 2005, Franzese Jr. wore a wire around his father. John Franzese Jr. testified twice against his father, the last time his father attempted to have him killed; he later lived under witness protection. In 2010, Franzese Jr. admitted that he received $50,000 from the FBI as a cooperating witness. He is the first son of a New York mobster to turn state's evidence and testify against his father.

With the help of Franzese Jr.'s testimony, the 93-year-old Franzese Sr., on January 14, 2011, was sentenced to eight years in prison for extorting two Manhattan strip clubs, running a loanshark operation and extorting a pizzeria on Long Island. Prosecutors had asked for a sentence of 12 years, while Franzese's lawyer asked for leniency based on a variety of ailments, including partial blindness and deafness, gout, and heart and kidney problems. Franzese was denied compassionate release in July 2016. Franzese was released from the Federal Medical Center in Devens, Massachusetts, on June 23, 2017, at the age of 100; he was the oldest federal inmate in the United States and the only centenarian in federal custody at the time of his release.

Movie business
Franzese is listed as an associate producer of the 2003 film This Thing of Ours, which starred James Caan. He also helped to finance the $22,000 budget of the 1972 pornographic film Deep Throat, which generated $30–50 million, and the 1974 slasher film The Texas Chain Saw Massacre, which earned over $30 million from a $80,000–140,000 investment.

Family and death
Franzese was married to a woman with whom he had three children. While married, John had gotten Cristina Capobianco, a 16-year-old cigarette girl at the Stork Club in Manhattan, pregnant with his son Michael Franzese.  To avoid having a scandal surrounding having a child out of wedlock, Capobianco married Frank Grillo.  After the mob allowed John to divorce his first wife, Grillo disappeared, and he married Capobianco. Due to this, Michael had initially believed that he had been adopted by John after the disappearance of Grillo, who Michael thought to be his biological father. Franzese had four more children with Capobianco, who died in 2012. Altogether, Franzese had eight children, 18 grandchildren and six great-grandchildren.

Michael Franzese had entered a pre-med program at Hofstra University in 1969, as John Franzese originally did not want him to be involved in organized crime. However, in 1971, shortly after his father had been sentenced to 50 years in prison for bank robbery, he decided to drop out of college to help his family earn money. After he was sentenced to 10 years in prison in 1986, Michael was ultimately released in 1994 and retired to California in 1995.

His younger son, John Franzese Jr., was a Colombo family associate before becoming an FBI informant. On June 23, 2017, Franzese was released and returned home. In 2019, Franzese Jr. met with his father at the nursing home where he resided and reconciled with him; John Jr. had previously voluntarily left the Witness Protection Program.

Franzese died in a New York City hospital, on February 24, 2020, aged 103. He was buried on February 28, at St. John Cemetery following his funeral at Church of Our Lady of Mount Carmel.

References

External links
 John Franzese on IMDb
American Gangster: The Sonny Franzese Story -Newsday

 

1917 births
2020 deaths
American centenarians
American bank robbers
American people convicted of robbery
American extortionists
Burials at St. John's Cemetery (Queens)
People convicted of racketeering
People acquitted of murder
American gangsters of Italian descent
American prisoners and detainees
Colombo crime family
Men centenarians
Italian emigrants to the United States
Prisoners and detainees of the United States federal government
Military personnel from New York City
Criminals from New York City
United States Army personnel of World War II
People from Roslyn, New York